Gilles Bousquet, known professionally as Mr. Flash, is a French record producer and DJ. He signed on the French electronic music label Ed Banger Records in 2003 and released the track "Radar Rider", which is also the first release of the label. In 2014, he released his first album Sonic Crusader.

Career
After meeting Pedro Winter, then manager of Daft Punk and looking to start a new record label, Mr. Flash's "Radar Rider" was to become the first release on Winter's Ed Banger Records. In addition to releasing his own music, Mr. Flash has produced tracks for rappers including Mos Def. He produced the entirety of Sébastien Tellier's 2012 album My God Is Blue. In 2018 he released "The Wild, The Beautiful and the Damned", first EP of the group Faded Away, formed with Nic Nicola.

Discography

Albums
 Monsieur Sexe (Ed Banger Records, 2005)
 Sonic Crusader (Ed Banger Records, 2014)

EPs
 Le Voyage Fantastique (Lust Island, 2001)
 Blood, Sweat & Tears (Ed Banger Records, 2010)

Singles
 "Radar Rider" b/w "F.I.S.T." (Ed Banger Records, 2003)
 "Supa Chick" b/w "Chop Suey" (Arcade Mode, 2005)
 "Champions" b/w "Disco Dynamite" (Ed Banger Records, 2006)

Compilations & Soundtracks
 "Radar Rider" on Ed Rec Vol. 1 (Ed Banger Records, 2006)
 "Disco Dynamite" and "Eagle Eyez" on Ed Rec Vol. 2 (Ed Banger Records, 2007)
 "Over The Top" on Ed Rec Vol. 3 (Ed Banger Records, 2008)
 "Acceleration", "Memories", "Payback" and "Battle" on Vandroid (Ed Banger Records, 2014)

Productions
 TTC - "Nonscience", "Teste Ta Comprehension", "Subway", and "Pollutions" from Ceci N'est Pas Un Disque (2002)
 TTC - "Champagne Sans Bulle" from Danser (2002)
 Mos Def - "Life in Marvelous Times", "The Embassy", and "Worker's Comp." from The Ecstatic (2009)
 Sébastien Tellier - My God Is Blue (2012)
 Faded Away - "The Wild, the Beautiful and the Damned" EP (2018)

Remixes
 Zongamin - "Bongo Song (Mr. Flash Type C Remix)" (2005)
 Mr. Oizo - "Negatif (Mr. Flash Remix)" (2008)
 Masta Ace - "Sittin' on Chrome (Mr. Flash Sittin' on Cr02 RMX)" (2008)
 Kanye West - "Paranoid (Mr. Flash Remix)" (2009)
 Darwin Deez - "Up in the Clouds (Mr. Flash Remix)" (2010)

References

External links
 
 

Because Music artists
French DJs
French hip hop musicians
French house musicians
French record producers
Living people
Musicians from Paris
Year of birth missing (living people)